Shagari is a Local Government Area in Sokoto State, Nigeria. Its headquarters are in the town of Shagari on the A1 highway. The LGA shares a border with Zamfara State in the south.

It has an area of 1,332 km and a population of 156,413 at the 2006 census.

The postal code of the area is 851.

References

Local Government Areas in Sokoto State